James Joseph Larkin (27 October 1874 – 10 December 1930) was an Australian rules footballer who played with Essendon in the Victorian Football League (VFL).

Nicknamed "Skeeter", Larkin played his football as a forward and on the wing. He came from West Melbourne originally but was recruited from North Melbourne, who competed in the Victorian Football Association.

Larkin finished the 1899 VFL season as Essendon's second leading goal-kicker, with 14 goals.

He was a half forward flanker in the 1901 Essendon premiership team and was a forward pocket in the side which lost the 1902 VFL Grand Final to Collingwood.

References

1874 births
1930 deaths
Australian rules footballers from Melbourne
Essendon Football Club players
Essendon Football Club Premiership players
West Melbourne Football Club players
North Melbourne Football Club (VFA) players
One-time VFL/AFL Premiership players
People from the City of Maribyrnong